Rosochy may refer to the following places:
Rosochy, Kuyavian-Pomeranian Voivodeship (north-central Poland)
Rosochy, Masovian Voivodeship (east-central Poland)
Rosochy, Świętokrzyskie Voivodeship (south-central Poland)
Rosochy, Greater Poland Voivodeship (west-central Poland)
Rosochy, Opole Voivodeship (south-west Poland)
Rosochy, Bytów County in Pomeranian Voivodeship (north Poland)
Rosochy, Wejherowo County in Pomeranian Voivodeship (north Poland)